James Grant The narrative of a voyage of discovery, performed in His Majesty's vessel the Lady Nelson, of sixty tons burthen, with sliding keels, in the years 1800, 1801 and 1802, to New South Wales by James Grant. To which is prefixed, An account of the origin of sliding keels Printed by C. Roworth for T. Egerton.
 Maison Verreaux a natural history dealership established in Paris by Jacques Philippe Verreaux

Birding and ornithology by year
1803 in science